Kenninghall and Banham Fens with Quidenham Mere is a  biological Site of Special Scientific Interest west of Banham, in Norfolk, England.

This site in the valley of the River Whittle has a lake, tall fen, wet woodland and calcareous grassland. Springs feed an area of fen grassland dominated by purple moor grass, blunt-flowered rush and black bog-rush.

The site is private land with no public access.

References

Sites of Special Scientific Interest in Norfolk
Quidenham